The following is a list of notable events and releases of the year 1938 in Norwegian music.

Events

 The Stavanger Symphony Orchestra was founded by NRK under the name 'Stavanger musikerforenings orkester'.

Deaths
 
 June
 24 – Anna Severine Lindeman, composer and music teacher (born 1859).

 September
 18 – Ole Hjellemo, violinist and composer (born 1876).

 December
 4 – Borghild Holmsen, pianist, music critic and composer (born 1865).

Births

 January
 17 – Alf Kjellman, jazz saxophonist (died 2010).

 April
 9 – Ivar Medaas, folk singer (died 2005).

 July
 7 – Trygve Henrik Hoff, singer, composer, songwriter, and writer (died 1987).

 October
 2 – Kjell Bartholdsen, jazz saxophonist (died 2009).

See also
 1938 in Norway
 Music of Norway

References

 
Norwegian music
Norwegian
Music
1930s in Norwegian music